A list of the historic and present capitals of Armenia.

See also
 List of cities and towns in Armenia
 Municipalities of Armenia

References 

Former capitals of Armenia
Lists of historical capitals